Yamunanagar, is a city and a municipal corporation in Yamunanagar district in the Indian state of Haryana. This town is known for the cluster of plywood units and paper  factories. It provides timber to larger industries. The older town is called Jagadhri. The Yamunanagar-Jagadhri railway station (YJUD) services the city. Despite its name, Jagadhri Railway  is situated in Yamunanagar. There is also another railway station called Jagadhri Workshop in Yamunanagar.

History
This town was part of Ambala district before it was made as separate district in November 1989. The town was formerly known as Abdullahpur and Jamnanagar. Before the Independence, it was a small village with most of the population lived around the railway station, which increased as a result of migration of refugees from West Punjab after the partition.

Geography
Yamunanagar has the river Yamuna (its namesake) running through the district, which forms the eastern boundary with the neighbouring Saharanpur district. This boundary is also a state boundary, as Saharanpur is in the state of Uttar Pradesh. The district also separates the Yamuna system from the Satluj river system.

From Yamunanagar, the Yamuna river enters the plain area for the first time. The historical river Saraswati also originates from Adi badri, also located in the district. Towards its northern edge is a sub-mountainous region, which has more forest cover and many streams; it is the area where the river Yamuna flows out of the hills and into the plains. The northern boundary is also an interstate boundary with the state of Himachal Pradesh to the north. Sirmour in Himachal is the district to its north with the towns of Nahan and Paonta Sahib close to the boundary with Yamunanagar.

Climate
Record High – 45.5 degrees 
Record Low – -0.5 degrees 
Record rainfall (24 hours) – 383mm in Jagadhri on 14 July 2016 .

Average Rainfall of Monsoon – 891 mm. Chhachhrauli and Bilaspur tehsils are the rainiest Tehsils in Haryana. They are known as "The Cherapunjjis of Haryana". Loo blows generally between 15 May to 20 June. Fog is common in December, January and February.

Rivers
The Western Yamuna Canal of the river Yamuna flows on one side of the city. This canal serves the irrigation needs of the farmers. The canal has century-old path ways, known locally as pattris, on both sides which serve as connecting routes between villages even today and also help the irrigation department to maintain the canal and serve as a perfect scenic walk—with water on one side and green lush farms on other. The Yamuna river marks the boundary of the district with the state of Uttar Pradesh, which borders the city on the eastern side. The neighbouring city is Saharanpur in the state of Uttar Pradesh. , the district borders the state of Himachal Pradesh, Sirmaur being the district and the towns of Nahan and Paonta Sahib being the towns nearby. Tajewala headworks—from where the Yamuna canal is diverted—also lies north of the city. Jagadhri is an adjoining town famous for its industrial brass sheet and stainless steel industry.

Demographics

As per provisional data of census 2011, Yamunanagar urban agglomeration had a population of 383,318, out of which males were 205,346 and females were 177,972. The population in the age range 0 to 6 years was 40,950. The total number of literates were 293,475, of which males were 163,791 and females were 129,684. The effective literacy rate of the population above 7 years of age was 85.72 percent.

Government and politics

Civic administration

Yamunanagar-Jagadhri Municipal Corporation 
The Yamunanagar-Jagadhri Municipal Corporation is headed by Municipal Commissioner Dharamvir Singh. The elected head is Mayor Madan Chauhan. The city is divided into 22 wards for the purpose of development, each of which is represented by a municipal councillor.

Economy

Industries

Yamuna Nagar is well known for its industries. It has emerged as an important industrial destination in the state. This has been despite its relatively isolated location within the state. Due to expanding industries, the city kept on extending geographically.

The main crops produced are sugarcane, wheat and rice. The city also produces sugar machinery, paper machinery, and highly efficient equipment for petrochemical plants, which are shipped to various refineries across the country. The city is also known for its plywood industries, which is attributed to the easy accessibility of primary raw material – poplar tree. It has also one of India's largest railways, carriage and wagon repair workshops. Recently, Reliance Infrastructure has also installed Deenbandhu Chhotu Ram Thermal Power Station in the town. Haryana Urban Development Authority has done major development work in the land stretch linking the city with Jagadhri, the other part of twin city which is known for its brass and stainless steel utensils.

Tourism
Located at the base of Shivalik Hills, Yamuna Nagar has moderately developed tourism industry.
 Kalesar National Park is one of the tourist spots which can be seen here. The place is located at the borders of Haryana, Himachal Pradesh, Uttar Pradesh and Uttarakhand. 
 Chaneti Buddhist Stupa is another notable tourist spot which according to Hieun Tsang, was built by King Ashoka.

Transport

Railways
 Yamunanagar has Two Railway station named Yamuna Nagar-Jagadhri & Jagadhri Workshop Railway station. It is on the popular direct route Amritsar–Kolkata Main Line. The bridge is named after  Shyama Prasad Mukherjee.

Roadways
Yamunanagar is well-connected to Delhi and other cities in Haryana such as Panipat, Karnal, Ambala, Kurukshetra, Kaithal and Rohtak. Four-laning of the highway connecting Yamunanagar to the state capital of Chandigarh via Panchkula was recently completed.

Education

Colleges and other educational institutes include:
 Mukand Lal National College
 Guru Nanak Khalsa College

Notable people 

 Sunil Dutt, actor and politician, father of Sanjay Dutt
 Karnam Malleswari, first Indian woman to win an Olympic medal
 Sumeet Passi, footballer, plays for India national football team and Jamshedpur FC
 Sanjeev Rajput, Arjuna awardee shooter
 Rani Rampal, female hockey player
 Deepika Thakur, India women's national field hockey team player
 Yog Dhian Thareja, Sewa Bharti awardee for social work
 Darshan Lal Jain, Padma Bhushan awardee for social work

References

External links
Yamunanagar district